Jan Erik Humlekjær (born 1946) is a Norwegian archer. He was born in Fredrikstad. He competed in archery at the 1972 Summer Olympics in Munich. He also competed at the 1976 Summer Olympics in Montreal.

He is the father of archer Lars Erik Humlekjær.

References

External links
 

1946 births
Living people
Sportspeople from Fredrikstad
Norwegian male archers
Olympic archers of Norway
Archers at the 1972 Summer Olympics
Archers at the 1976 Summer Olympics